The First Battle of Fort Fisher was a naval siege in the American Civil War, when the Union tried to capture the fort guarding Wilmington, North Carolina, the South's last major Atlantic port. Led by Major General Benjamin Butler, it lasted from December 24–27, 1864.

The Union navy first attempted to detonate a ship filled with powder in order to demolish the fort's walls but this failed; the navy then launched a two-day bombardment in order to demolish the fort and compel surrender. On the second day, the Union army started landing troops in order to begin the siege. But Butler got news of enemy reinforcements approaching, and in the worsening weather conditions, he aborted the operation, declaring the fort to be impregnable. To his embarrassment, Butler was relieved of command on January 8, 1865, and was replaced by Major General Alfred H. Terry, who led a follow-up expedition that captured the fort one week later.

Background
After the failed Bermuda Hundred Campaign, Major General Benjamin Butler and his Army of the James were assigned to an amphibious expedition against Fort Fisher. Lieutenant General Ulysses S. Grant had originally designated one of Butler's subordinates, Major General Godfrey Weitzel, to lead the expedition, but Butler, as the commander of the Department of Virginia and North Carolina, demanded that he lead the troops himself and Grant acquiesced. Units for the expedition were selected from the Army of the James and included the 2nd Division of the XXIV Corps and the 3rd Division from the XXV Corps, along with two battalions of heavy artillery and engineers. Colonel Cyrus B. Comstock from Grant's staff went along to serve as chief engineer. The Union naval expedition under Rear Admiral David D. Porter comprised the largest Union fleet of the war, nearly 60 warships along with the transports to carry the army troops.

Although many in the Union high command (including Grant and Gideon Welles) doubted the plan would work, it was approved by Lincoln. The final Union plan was for the ships to gather at Hampton Roads, where the army troops would board the transports. Because the monitors used in the attack had to be towed to Fort Fisher, the navy would leave with a twelve-hour head start over the transports. The warships would refuel at Beaufort, then meet the transports at Fort Fisher, when the Louisiana would be detonated and the troops landed under the fire of the warships.

Fort Fisher, on Confederate Point, nicknamed the "Gibraltar of the Confederacy", was a formidable target commanding the Cape Fear River. It encompassed 14,500 ft.² and was surrounded by a 10-foot parapet and a network of bombproofs, most of which were 30 feet high. Many obstructions were laid around it, including land mines (called torpedoes in this era), abatis, and deep ditches. There were more than 50 heavy cannon, including 15 Columbiads and a 150-pounder Armstrong gun, behind a 60-foot mound of earth near the sea, named the Mound Battery. The fort's garrison of 1,400 men was commanded by Colonel William Lamb. Additional reinforcements were available from General Braxton Bragg at Sugar Loaf, 4 miles away. This force consisted of Major General Robert F. Hoke's division from the Army of Northern Virginia, which arrived on December 23.

Opposing forces

Union

Army
Expeditionary Corps (Army of the James) – MG. Benjamin F. Butler, MG Godfrey Weitzel (second-in-command)
 2nd Division (XXIV Corps) – BG. Adelbert Ames
 1st Brigade - Brevet BG. Newton M. Curtis
 3rd New York – Cpt. George W. Warren
 112th New York – Ltc. John W. Smith
 117th New York – Col. Rufus Daggett
 142nd New York - Ltc. Albert M. Barney
 2nd Brigade - Col. Galusha Pennypacker
 47th New York – Cpt. Joseph P. McDonald
 48th New York – Ltc. William B. Coan
 76th Pennsylvania – Col. John S. Littell
 97th Pennsylvania – Lt. John Wainwright
 203rd Pennsylvania - Col. John W. Moore
 3rd Brigade - Col. Louis Bell
 13th Indiana – Cpt. Samuel M. Zent
 4th New Hampshire – Cpt. John H. Roberts
 115th New York – Maj Ezra L. Walrath
 169th New York – Col. Alonzo Alden
 Artillery
 16th Independent Battery New York Light Artillery - Cpt. Richard H. Lee
 Naval Brigade - BG Charles K. Graham
 3rd Division (XXV Corps) – BG. Charles J. Paine
 2nd Brigade - Col. John W. Ames
 4th USCT – Ltc. George Rogers
 6th USCT – Ltc. Clark Royce
 30th USCT – Ltc. Hiram A. Oakman
 39th USCT – Col. Ozora P. Stearns
 3rd Brigade - Col. Elias Wright
 1st USCT - Ltc. Giles H. Rich
 5th USCT – Col. Giles W. Shurtleff
 10th USCT - Ltc. Edward H. Powell
 37th USCT – Col. Nathan Goff Jr.
 107th USCT - Ltc. David M. Sells
 Artillery
 Battery E, 3rd U.S. Artillery – Lt. John Myrick

Navy
North Atlantic Blockading Squadron – Rear Admiral David D. Porter:
 Line Number 1
 USS Canonicus – Lcdr. George Belknap
 USS Huron – Lcdr. Thomas O. Selfridge Jr.
 USS Kansas – Lcdr. Pendleton G. Watmough
 USS Mahopac – Lcdr. Edward Potter
 USS Monadnock – Cmdr. Enoch G. Parrott
 USS New Ironsides – Cmdr. William Radford
 USS Nyack – Lcdr. L. Howard Newman
 USS Pequot – Lcdr. Daniel L. Braine
 USS Pontoosuc – Lcdr. William G. Temple
 USS Saugus – Cmdr. Edmund R. Colhoun
 USS Unadilla – Lcdr. Frank M. Ramsay
 Line Number 2
 USS Bignonia – Lt. Warrington D. Roath
 USS Brooklyn – Cpt. James Alden
 USS Colorado – Cdre. Henry K. Thatcher
 USS Juniata – Cpt. William Rogers Taylor
 USS Mackinaw – Cmdr. John C. Beaumont
 USS Maumee – Lcdr. Ralph Chandler
 USS Minnesota – Cdre. Joseph Lanman
 USS Mohican – Cmdr. Daniel Ammen
 USS Pawtuxet – Cmdr. James H. Spotts
 USS Powhatan – Cdre. James F. Schenck
 USS Seneca – Lcdr. Montgomery Sicard
 USS Shenandoah – Cpt. Daniel B. Ridgley
 USS Susquehanna – Cdre. Sylvanus William Godon
 USS Ticonderoga – Cpt. Charles Steedman
 USS Tuscarora – Cmdr. James M. Frailey
 USS Vanderbilt – Cpt. Charles W. Pickering
 USS Wabash – Cpt. Melancton Smith
 USS Yantic – Lcdr. Thomas C. Harris
 Line Number 3
 USS Chippewa – Lcdr. Aaron Weaver
 USS Fort Jackson – Cpt. Benjamin F. Sands
 USS Iosco – Cmdr. John Guest
 USS Monticello – Lt. Daniel A. Campbell
 USS Osceola – Cmdr. John M.B. Clitz
 USS Quaker City – Cmdr. William F. Spicer
 USS Rhode Island – Cmdr. Stephen D. Trenchard
 USS Santiago de Cuba – Cpt. Oliver S. Glisson
 USS Sassacus – Lcdr. John L. Davis
 USS Tacony – Lcdr. William T. Truxton
 Reserve Line
 USS Advance – Lcdr. John H. Upshur
 USS Alabama – Lt. Frank Smith
 USS Aries – Lt. Francis S. Wells
 USS Anemone – Ens. William C. Borden
 USS Banshee – Lt. Walter H. Garfield
 USS Britannia – Lt. Samuel Huse
 USS Cherokee – Lt. William E. Dennison
 USS Emma – Lt. Thomas C. Dunn
 USS Eolus
 USS Gettysburg – Lt. Roswell Lamson
 USS Governor Buckingham – Lt. John MacDiarmid
 USS Lilian – Lt. T.A. Harris
 USS Little Ada
  – Lcdr. Benjamin H. Porter
 USS Maratanza – Lcdr. George Young
 USS Moccasin – Ens. James Brown
 USS Montgomery – Lt. Edward H. Faucon
 USS Nansemond
 USS R. R. Cuyler – Cmdr. Charles Henry Bromedge Caldwell
 USS Tristram Shandy – Lt. Edward F. Devens
 USS Wilderness

Confederate
 District of Cape Fear – MG. William H.C. Whiting
 Fort Fisher Garrison - Col. William Lamb
 10th North Carolina - Ltc. John P.W. Read (w), Maj. James Reilly
 36th North Carolina - Col. William Lamb
 40th North Carolina
 1st Battalion North Carolina Junior Reserves - Maj. D.T. Millard
 1st Battalion North Carolina Heavy Artillery, Co. D - Cpt. James L. McCormic
 3rd Battalion North Carolina Light Artillery, Co. C - Cpt. John M. Sutton
 13th Battalion North Carolina Light Artillery, Co. D - Cpt. Zachariah T. Adams
 Confederate Navy Detachment – Lt. Robert T. Chapman
 Confederate Marine Corps Detachment – Cpt. A.C. Van Benthuysen
 Hoke's Division (Army of Northern Virginia) – MG. Robert F. Hoke
 Hagood's Brigade - BG. Johnson Hagood
 7th South Carolina Battalion - Ltc. James H. Rion
 11th South Carolina - Col. F. Hay Gantt
 21st South Carolina - Col. Robert F. Graham
 25th South Carolina - Cpt. James Carson
 27th South Carolina
 Kirkland's Brigade - BG. William Kirkland
 17th North Carolina - Ltc. Thomas H. Sharp
 42nd North Carolina - Col. John E. Brown
 66th North Carolina - Col. John H. Nethercutt
 Connally's Brigade, North Carolina Reserves  – Col. John K. Connally
 4th Battalion North Carolina Junior Reserves - Maj. John M. Reece
 7th Battalion North Carolina Junior Reserves - Maj. William F. French
 8th Battalion North Carolina Junior Reserves - Maj. James Ellington
 8th Battalion North Carolina Senior Reserves - Col. Allmond McKoy
 Artillery
 Southerland's Battery - Cpt. Thomas J. Southerland
 Paris's Battery, Staunton Hill Artillery - Cpt. Andrew B. Paris

Battle

The Union forces prepared to leave Hampton Roads on December 10, but a winter storm hit the fleet for three days, preventing the fleet's departure until the 14th. The transports carrying Butler's force arrived at Fort Fisher first, since the navy took longer to refuel at Beaufort than expected. When Porter's ships arrived on the 19th, another storm hit the fleet, causing some ships to scatter and forcing the army transports to return to Beaufort. After the storm subsided on the 23rd, Porter decided to start the attack without Butler, ordering the Louisiana to be blown up that night. Near midnight, the ship was towed close to the fort's seawall and set on fire. However, the Louisiana was farther out to sea than the navy thought, perhaps as far as a mile offshore; as a result, Fort Fisher was undamaged by the blast.

The following morning (December 23), the Union navy moved closer to shore and began a bombardment of the fort, hoping to damage the earthworks and forcing the garrison to surrender. Despite firing close to 10,000 shells that day, only minor damage was caused, with four seacoast gun carriages disabled, one light artillery caisson destroyed, and 23 casualties in the garrison. Meanwhile, there were 45 Union casualties from exploding guns aboard ships, and the Confederates were able to score direct hits on three ships.

The transports carrying the Union soldiers arrived that evening. Initially, Butler thought that by exploding the Louisiana and starting the bombardment without the army, Porter had given the Confederates warning that the Union assault was coming and would therefore have time to contest the landings. However he was convinced to land a reconnaissance party to determine if an attack was still feasible. The landings started Christmas morning, with Brig. Gen. Adelbert Ames' division the first to be ashore, while the navy continued bombarding the fort. The Union troops captured a battery protecting the beach north of Fort Fisher, and accepted the surrender of the 4th and 8th North Carolina Junior Reserve battalions, which had been cut off by the Union landings. After setting up a defensive line, Ames sent the brigade of N. Martin Curtis towards the fort to see if it could be attacked. Curtis found the land wall lightly defended and was prepared to attack, but was prevented from doing so by Ames. Butler was convinced that the fort was undamaged and too strong for an assault; he had also received word that Hoke's division was a few miles north of the fort, and another storm was forming in the area. All this convinced him to halt the landings and order the troops on the beach to return to the ships; the entire Union fleet then returned to Hampton Roads.

Aftermath
The fiasco at Fort Fisher, specifically Butler's disobeyance of his direct orders—orders which Butler failed to communicate either to Porter or to Weitzel—gave Grant an excuse to relieve Butler, replacing him in command of the Army of the James by Major General Edward Ord. President Abraham Lincoln, recently reelected, no longer needed to keep the prominent Democrat in the Army and he was relieved on January 8, 1865. To Butler's further embarrassment, Fort Fisher fell one week later when Major General Alfred H. Terry led a second assault against the Confederate stronghold; while defending his decision to break off the attack before the Joint Committee on the Conduct of the War, Butler had deemed the fort impregnable.

Confederate losses amounted to five killed and mortally wounded, fifty-six wounded, and six hundred captured, while the damage caused by the bombardment was quickly repaired. Blockade runners continued using the port, the next ships to arrive did so the very night the Union fleet withdrew. Although Whiting and Lamb were convinced that the Union force would shortly return,  Bragg withdrew Hoke's Division back to Wilmington and started making plans to recapture New Bern.

See also
 Second Battle of Fort Fisher
 Wilmington, North Carolina, in the Civil War
 Bibliography of early American naval history

Notes

References
 Eicher, David J., The Longest Night: A Military History of the Civil War, Simon & Schuster, 2001, .
 Fonvielle Jr., Chris E. Last Rays of Departing Hope:The Wilmington Campaign. Campbell, CA.: Savas Publishing Company, 1997. 
 Foote, Shelby, The Civil War: A Narrative, Vol. 3: Red River to Appomattox, Random House, 1974, .
 Gragg, Rod, Confederate Goliath: The Battle of Fort Fisher. Baton Rouge: Louisiana State University Press, 1994. 
 Martin, Samuel J. General Braxton Bragg, C.S.A.. McFarland: First edition, 2011. . .
 McPherson, James M., Battle Cry of Freedom: The Civil War Era (Oxford History of the United States), Oxford University Press, 1988, .
 Pelzer, John D. "Ben Butler's Powder Boat Scheme." in America's Civil War, Vol. 7, No. 6 (January 1996).
 CWSAC Report Update

External links
 National Park Service battle description

Wilmington campaigns
Battles of the Eastern Theater of the American Civil War
Confederate victories of the American Civil War
Naval battles of the American Civil War
Battles of the American Civil War in North Carolina
New Hanover County, North Carolina
Sieges of the American Civil War
Conflicts in 1864
1864 in North Carolina
December 1864 events